The 2021–22 Women's LEN Trophy is the 23rd edition of the European second-tier tournament for women's water polo clubs. It was a two-legged final that was played in Dunaújváros, Hungary, and Piraeus, Greece on 25 and 30 March 2022. Ethnikos won its second LEN Trophy to become the Greek team with the most titles regarding this competition.

Teams 
The participants were the four teams eliminated from the Euro League's quarterfinals but due to the Russian invasion in Ukraine, only Dunaújvárosi FVE and Ethnikos Piraeus will contest the final after the disqualification of Russian teams.

.

|}

Finals 
Source:

See also 
 2021–22 LEN Euro League Women

References

External links 
 Official LEN website

2021–22 in LEN water polo
2022 in water polo

Women's LEN Trophy seasons